United States Army commissioned officers rank insignia in use today.

Structure

The commissioned officers ranks of the United States Army can be split into three categories, from  highest to lowest: general officers, field grade officers and company grade officers. General officers encompass the ranks from brigadier general up. Field grade includes major, lieutenant colonel, and colonel. Company grade includes second lieutenant, first lieutenant, and captain.

Silver versus gold
In terms of heraldic tradition, insignia changes over time created the situation of silver outranking gold. Beginning in 1780, general officer rank was designated by silver stars. Beginning in the 1830s, colonels wore silver eagles, with the color likely chosen because general officers already wore silver. Infantry officers wore silver epaulettes, while other branches wore gold, and their rank insignia was the opposite color of their epaulettes, so Infantry first lieutenants and captains wore gold bars. All second lieutenants wore epaulettes with no insignia.

During the American Civil War, all lieutenant colonels were directed to wear a silver oak leaf with gold braid on the epaulette, and all majors a gold leaf with silver braid. In 1872, the army began to use shoulder knots instead of epaulettes. Since generals, colonels, and lieutenant colonels already wore silver, changing the insignia of first lieutenants and captains from gold to silver was logical. Since majors already wore gold oak leaves, maintaining the current policy was also logical. Shoulder knots with no insignia designated second lieutenants. By World War I, metal collar insignia was regularly used to designate officers, requiring a way to differentiate between second lieutenants and privates; since silver bars already designated first lieutenants, the army opted to use gold for second lieutenants.

General of the Army / Armies

While not currently in use today, special insignia were authorized by Congress for ten general officers who were promoted to the highest ranks in the United States Army: General of the Army, designed as a "five-star" rank, and General of the Armies, considered to be the equivalent of a "six-star" rank. Eight generals were promoted to the rank and title "General of the Army" (Ulysses S. Grant, William Tecumseh Sherman, Philip Sheridan, George C. Marshall, Douglas MacArthur, Dwight D. Eisenhower, Henry H. Arnold, and Omar Bradley), while two generals were promoted to the higher rank and title of "General of the Armies of the United States" (George Washington and John J. Pershing).

Congress created the rank of General of the Armies specifically for Washington, although while living he never officially accepted the honor. Pershing received the rank in 1919 and was allowed to choose his own insignia; he chose to use four silver stars. In 1976, Congressman Mario Biaggi of New York submitted a house resolution granting Washington the promotion. The promotion was effective on July 4, 1976, the bicentennial of the Declaration of Independence. Although Pershing accepted the rank in 1919 and technically had a date of rank that preceded Washington's, the new law specified that no other officer of the United States Army should ever outrank Washington, including Pershing. Hence, effective date of rank notwithstanding, Washington was permanently made superior to all other officers of the United States Armed Forces, past or present.

While no living officer holds either of these ranks today, the General of the Army title and five-star insignia designed in 1944 are still authorized for use in wartime. Congress may promote generals to this rank for successful wartime campaigns, or to give the officer parity in rank to foreign counterparts in joint coalitions, specifically with respect to field marshals.

History

1775–1780: cockades or sashes
The structure of United States military ranks had its roots in British military traditions, adopting the same or similar ranks and titles. At the start of the American Revolutionary War in 1775, the Continental Army's lack of standardized uniforms and insignia proved confusing for soldiers in the field. To correct the situation, George Washington, who had been appointed general and commander in chief, recommended the following stopgap solution for distinguishing the ranks:

Generals wore a sash diagonally across their shoulders between their coats and waistcoats. Brigadier generals wore a pink sash, major generals a purple sash, and George Washington as commander in chief, wore a light blue sash. Aides-de-camp (mostly with the rank of captain) to officers of general grades wore a green sash.

Later on in the war, the Continental Army established its own uniform with a black and white cockade among all ranks. Infantry officers had silver and other branches gold insignia.

1780–1821: epaulettes
In 1780, regulations prescribed fringed epaulettes for all officer ranks, with silver stars for general officers. Field officers wore two epaulettes, captains one epaulette on the right shoulder, subalterns one epaulette on the left shoulder. For commissioned officers 'metal epaulettes were introduced by a general order dated June 18. 1780 (except of those of the CiC). For non-commissioned officers cloth epaulettes were prescribed since a general order dated July 23. 1775. That order differentiated only between the ranks of serjeant and corporal. At the end of war, the serjeant-major was recognizable by a pair of cloth epaulettes. The number, position and color of the NCO-epaulettes was changed for several times.

1821–1832: chevrons or epaulettes
From 1821 to 1832, the Army used chevrons to identify company officer grades, a practice that is still observed at West Point for cadet officers. Adjutants were indicated by a single point up gold (infantry: silver) lace chevron and arc on both upper sleeves, captains the same but no arcs, lieutenants wore the chevrons on the lower sleeves. All company officers wore dark blue "wings" with gold (infantry: silver) fringes and Embroidery.

General staff, artillery, engineer and field officers wore bullion fringed epaulets: Generals with silver eagle insignia and one or two five-pointed stars, depending on rank. Colonels wore the silver eagle (infantry: gold) insignia as well, lieutenant colonel and major identic plain gold (infantry: silver) epaulets. Captains a single epaulet on the right shoulder, lieutenants on the left shoulder.

1832–1851: epaulettes and slashflaps vs. shoulder straps (1836)
In 1832, epaulettes were specified for all officers. The epaulettes worn by the infantry were silver, while all other branches had gold epaulettes. In order that the rank insignia would be clearly discernible, they were of the opposite color; that is, the infantry colonels had an eagle of gold because it was placed on a silver epaulet and all other colonels had silver eagles on gold epaulettes. The grade of adjutant was abolished and the lieutenant grade separated into two grades (first and second lieutenant). For the first time, a fatigue or undress uniform was introduced. The so-called "passants", shoulder straps holding the epaulets, were used to develop a new system of rank insignia.

In addition, there was on the cuffs a slashflap with several horizontal rows of lace with a button on the outer ends. The lace was of yellow colour (infantry, white). Field officers wore four flaps and buttons, captains wore three, lieutenants wore two.

In 1836, shoulder straps were adopted to replace epaulettes for field duty. The straps followed the same color combination as the epaulettes; that is, the border was gold with silver insignia for all officers except those of infantry which had silver border with gold insignia. At that time, lieutenant colonels and majors were authorized leaves, captains were authorized two bars, and first lieutenants were authorized one bar on the shoulder straps.

1851–1872: epaulettes vs. shoulder straps 
In 1851, it was decided to use only silver eagles for colonels, as a matter of economy. The silver eagle was selected based on the fact that there were more colonels with the silver eagle that those with gold, primarily in the cavalry and artillery, hence it was cheaper to replace the numerically fewer gold ones in the infantry. At that time on the shoulder straps, lieutenant colonels wore an embroidered silver leaf; majors wore a gold embroidered leaf; and captains and first lieutenants wore gold bars. The second lieutenant had no grade insignia, but the presence of an epaulet or shoulder strap identified him as a commissioned officer. For majors, the shoulder strap contained an oak leaf, but like the second lieutenant, the epaulet had no grade insignia. However, the major was still distinguishable from the second lieutenant due to the more elaborate epaulet fringes worn by field grade officers.

Prior to 1851 the infantry wore shoulder straps that had a silver border with gold insignia, the other branches wore gold border with silver insignia. The rank of major and lieutenant colonel were designated by oak leaves. A lieutenant colonel was determined by the color of the border, so an infantry Lt. Col. wore silver oak leaves, and other branches wore gold oak leaves. In 1851 the Army did away with the infantry distinctions, with everyone going to gold borders. Senior officers, lieutenant colonels, colonels, and generals wore silver insignia. Second lieutenants had no rank, first lieutenants, captains, and majors wore gold insignia. In 1872 the ranks of first lieutenant and captain reverted to silver insignia.

1872–1917: shoulder straps
In 1872, epaulettes were abolished for officers and replaced by shoulder knots. As the shoulder knots had no fringe, it was necessary that some change in the insignia on the dress uniform be made in order to distinguish the major from the second lieutenant. It was natural to use the gold leaf which the major had been wearing on the shoulder strap. In the same year, the bars on the shoulder straps of the captains and first lieutenants were changed from gold to silver.

1917–2014: shoulder loops
By 1917 and the time of World War I, the olive drab service uniform had gradually become used more frequently and the blue uniform was worn only on formal dress occasions. As a result, metal insignia was authorized for wear on the service uniform on the shoulder loop and on the collar of the shirt when worn without a jacket. Shortly after the United States entered the war, only the service olive drab uniform was being worn. The need for an insignia for the second lieutenant became urgent. Among the proposals was one to authorize for that grade a single bar, the first lieutenant two bars, and the captain three bars. However, the policy of making as little change as possible prevailed, and a gold bar was adopted in 1917, following the precedent previously established by the adoption of the major's insignia.

In 1944, officers and enlisted personnel in leadership positions started wearing leader identification badges - narrow green bands under their rank insignia; this was initially approved as a temporary measure for European Theater of Operations, but was approved for select branches in 1945 then for the entire Army in 1948.

Timeline

See also
United States Army enlisted rank insignia
Comparative army officer ranks of the Americas

Notes

References

External links
US Army Officer Ranks - United States Army website
Department of Defense Rank Insignias — Officers Rank
US Army Officer insignia
Silver and Gold Rank Insignia in the US Armed Forces uniform-reference.net

United States Army officers
United States Army rank insignia

cs:Seznam hodností ozbrojených sil Spojených států amerických
he:דרגות הכוחות המזוינים של ארצות הברית
pl:Stopnie wojskowe Stanów Zjednoczonych